The Belgium national baseball team is the national baseball team of Belgium. The team competes in the bi-annual European Baseball Championship.

Tournament results
Baseball World Cup

European Baseball Championship

Team Belgium competed in the 2019 European Baseball Championship, coming in tied for 7th out of 12 teams.

European Junior Baseball Championship

European Under-21 Baseball Championship

National baseball teams in Europe

National sports teams of Belgium